Ghanegaon is a village in Parner taluka in Ahmednagar district of state of Maharashtra, India.

Religion
The majority of the population in the village is Hindu.

Demographics 
Most of the villagers are farmers.

Economy

Farming is the primary occupation in the village. The major crops include onion and pea. Other crops include Jowar, Bajra and Wheat.

Ghanegaon is the largest producer of onion among all the villages in the Parner tehsil. The seasonal onion output is more than 20,000 gunny bags (100 trucks), most of which goes to the Pune vegetable market.

See also
 Villages in Parner taluka

References 

Villages in Parner taluka
Villages in Ahmednagar district